Leucanopsis pohli is a moth of the family Erebidae. It was described by William Schaus in 1927. It is found in Brazil.

References

pohli
Moths described in 1927